Şirvanovka (also, Şırvanovka and Shirvanovka) is a village and municipality in the Qusar Rayon of Azerbaijan next to the Azerbaijan–Russia border. It has a population of 1,210.  The municipality consists of the villages of Şirvanovka and Zuxuloba.

References 

Populated places in Qusar District